KEDD-LD, virtual channel 45 (UHF digital channel 27), is a low-powered HSN affiliated television station licensed to Los Angeles, California, United States. Founded on January 17, 2003, the station is owned by Venture Technologies Group. The station once had an application to move to channel 69, but channel 69 was removed from the North America television band plan in 2011.

External links

Low-power television stations in the United States
EDD-LD
EDD-LD